Francisco Mendoza (died 29 March 1536) was a Roman Catholic prelate who served as Bishop of Palencia (1534–1536),
Bishop of Zamora (1527–1534),
and Bishop of Oviedo (1525–1527).

Biography
On 6 November 1525, Francisco Mendoza was selected by the King of Spain and confirmed by Pope Clement VII as Bishop of Oviedo. 
On 3 April 1527, he was selected by the King of Spain and confirmed by Pope Clement VII as Bishop of Zamora. 
On 18 January 1534, he was selected by the King of Spain and confirmed by Pope Clement VII as Bishop of Palencia. 
He served as Bishop of Palencia until his death on 29 March 1536.

While bishop, he was the principal consecrator of Fernando Valdés, Bishop of Elne (1529) and Rodrigo de Bastidas y Rodriguez de Romera, Bishop of Coro (1532); and was the principal co-consecrator of Tomás de Berlanga, Bishop of Panamá (1534).

References

External links and additional sources
 (for Chronology of Bishops) 
 (for Chronology of Bishops) 
 (for Chronology of Bishops) 
 (for Chronology of Bishops) 
 (for Chronology of Bishops) 
 (for Chronology of Bishops) 

1536 deaths
16th-century Roman Catholic bishops in Spain
Bishops appointed by Pope Clement VII